Dukun is a 2018 Malaysian Malay-language legal horror-thriller film filmed in 2006. The film is loosely based on the true story of the gruesome murder of a Malaysian politician at the time, Datuk Mazlan Idris, by Mona Fandey, a once mildly popular Malaysian singer-turned-witch doctor convicted in 1993. The film was originally slated to be released in 2007 but it was postponed and no official statements was given, due to the adaption of a true high-profile murder case and the controversial nature of the film. Mona Fandey's family herself had voiced their dissatisfaction over the content and basis of the film after announcement of the film release. The producers have since claimed that the film was loosely based on those true events themselves.

The film regained significant attention 12 years later when news got around of its leak footage of the movie resurfaced online drawing stern attention from FINAS, the police and Astro Shaw. After much contemplating on part of Astro Shaw, it was decided and announced that the film will be released nationwide on 5 April 2018, after more than 10 years of finished production.

Synopsis
Karim is a public defender in Kuala Lumpur. He is a single father whose wife ran away many years ago. More recently, his teenage daughter, Nadia, ran away from home. He hires Daud, a former police officer to help track Nadia down but they keep missing her. Daud soon begins to suspect that there is something supernatural blocking them from finding Nadia.

A desperate Karim approaches on old friend who works for the government to alert him if Nadia is found by the authorities. In return, he agrees to defend a Diana Dahlan, a woman shaman who has been arrested for allegedly murdering Datuk Jeffrey, a high-profile businessman during a pagan ritual. During their first meeting, Diana surprises Karim by revealing his past. She knows he and his wife had difficulty conceiving, but the wife eventually gave birth to Nadia. Since then, his wife has gone missing and Nadia has run away from home. Karim starts to believe that Diana does indeed have supernatural abilities.

Meanwhile, Talib and Shah, the officers investigating the Diana Dahlan case find a string of powerful and wealthy men who have gone missing. In an effort to find a connection between these disappearances, Talib meets Daud, who investigated some of the earlier cases. Daud implies that people worship not just facing Mecca, but in all directions nowadays because of fame and wealth, and that he fears the longer Talib investigates this case, the more he would be prone to temptation.

After Daud is murdered by Danni, Diana's assistant, Talib starts to understand that Daud was actually giving him a clue. Diana used to live in the northern, southern, eastern and western regions of the city. After excavating all her former homes, Talib and Shah find dead bodies in each and every one of them. All except one of the bodies are men, who used to be Diana's clients. While studying the female victim's body, Talib and Shah find that it has been mummified with only its womb removed.

Later that night, Nadia is found by the authorities and placed in a women's jail. However, she becomes possessed and turns hysterical. When she is placed in the hospital wing, she is visited by Diana's spirit. It is then revealed in flashbacks that before Nadia's conception, Karim's wife secretly met Diana for her help. In return, Karim's wife was supposed to sacrifice her second fetus. However, when she does become pregnant again years later, Karim's wife does not want to undergo the ritual. However, her womb is forcefully removed by Diana and Danni, and she dies during the ritual.

In court, it is revealed that Diana did not intend to kill Jeffrey. Instead, he was supposed to adhere to certain taboos for a few days in order to become invincible. In order to test his invincibility, Diana tried to chop him with her sword but ended up killing him. She and her assistant then sliced the body into eighteen pieces to dispose it. Karim tries to argue for Diana's sentence to be reduced to manslaughter since she did not intend to kill Jeffrey. However, the court finds her guilty and sentences her to death by hanging. Diana waves her right to appeal and instead chooses to be hanged immediately.

After the verdict, Karim goes to the women's prison to fetch Nadia but is instead told that she had left after being released. He is later informed by Talib that the mummified woman's body found at Diana's old house is none other than his wife's. After Diana is hanged to death, we see her spirit has possessed Nadia, who is now the new woman shaman.

Cast
 Umie Aida as Diana Dahlan, the murderer main character based on Mona Fandey.
 Faizal Hussein as Karim Osman, Diana's lawyer, who also narrates the film.
 Nam Ron as ASP Talib, investigating Officer Talib
 Hasnul Rahmat as Danni
 Adlin Aman Ramlie as Datuk Jefri, Diana's client and eventual victim
 Elyana as Nadia Abdul Karim
 Chew Kin Wah as Dato' Angus Lim
 Soffi Jikan as Fadzli
 Bront Palarae as Insp. Shah
 Ramli Hassan as Daud
 Avaa Vanja as Sara Jamaluddin
 Mislina Mustaffa as Halimah Jusoh
 Jason Chong as Forensics Chan
 Joey Daud as Jamal
 Adman Salleh as Profesor Azmi
 C. Kumaresan as Murali
 Goh You Ping as Daniel Ong
 Kasmadiana as Puan Aisha
 Ganesan Sundaram Moorthy as Ravi
 Abu Bakar Juah as Judge
 Ibrahim Akir as Imam
 Norrihan Haji Yakub as Chief Prison Warden
 Zanoora, Dianatasha, Amira Mohd. Razali, Azizah Sulaiman as Prison Warden
 Kazar Saisi as Hanging officers
 Amal Fatih Mustafa as Trainee Hangman
 Nadiya Nisaa as Halimah's eldest child
 Balkisyh Semundur Khan as Woman Batak
 Rahhim Omar as Indonesia General
 Wan Mohammad as Indonesian Soldier
 Paul Colclough as Foreign Reporter
 Shyama Ramasamy as Local Reporter
 Alia Soraya as Girl in Derelict Building
 Betty Rahmad & Martina Newarni as Nadia's Cellmates
 Eijja Salleh as Court Interpreter
 Noor Alycia Norman Sabri as Young Nadia
 Najiha Izzaty as Halimah's Younger Daughter
 Noor Natasha Norman Sabri as Halimah's Eldest Daughter
 Prakash Krishna as Forensics Officer
 Rafiei Hasan & Ahmad Rahiki Selamat as ASP Talib's Policeman
 Kamal Gerak Khas, Hairullanuar Ahmed as Court Policeman
 Chermaine Poo & Hafeeza Edznor Masrum as Junior Prosecutors
 Norhaida Baharin, Shahriza Sabri, Diana Shahrin & Fatin Hajla as Police Woman Escorts
 Azura as Tongkat Batak Courier

Reception

Box-office
Dukun netted RM1.5 million on its first day of screening throughout Malaysia and Brunei - the highest opening night gross for Astro Shaw-, which accumulated to RM6.2 million after four days of release. It went on to rake in RM10 million over 20 days after its release. The film was also screened in Singapore, Brunei and Indonesia. In Singapore, Dukun was screened at 19 screens, the widest released Malay-language film in Singapore in recent years.

References

External links
 
 Information from Filem Kita
 

2018 films
2018 horror films
Malay-language films
Malaysian horror films
Astro Shaw films
Malaysian supernatural horror films
Legal horror films
Films about capital punishment
Film controversies in Malaysia